Jean-Félix-Albert-Marie Vilnet (8 April 1922  – 23 January 2013) was a French prelate of the Roman Catholic Church.

Vilnet was born in Chaumont and was ordained a priest on 22 October 1944. Vilnet was appointed bishop of the Diocese of Saint-Dié on 24 September 1964 and consecrated on 13 December 1964.

On 16 June 1968, Bishop Vilnet was involved in a serious automobile accident with another vehicle driven by future American presidential candidate Mitt Romney.

Vilnet was appointed to the Diocese of Lille on 13 August 1983 and remained there until his retirement on 2 July 1998.

See also
List of Légion d'honneur recipients by name
Archdiocese of Lille
Diocese of Saint-Dié

External links
Catholic-Hierarchy
Lille Diocese (French)
 Saint-Dié Diocese (French)

References

20th-century Roman Catholic bishops in France
Participants in the Second Vatican Council
1922 births
2013 deaths
Bishops of Saint-Dié